WKSE (98.5 FM) is a commercial radio station licensed to Niagara Falls, New York, serving the Buffalo metropolitan area and Western New York. It has a Top 40/CHR radio format and is owned by Audacy, Inc., with studios on Corporate Parkway in Amherst, New York.  It calls itself Kiss 98.5.

WKSE has an effective radiated power (ERP) of 46,000 watts.  The transmitter is off Staley Avenue on Grand Island, New York.  Its signal extends into the Niagara Region of Ontario as well as Hamilton and Toronto.  WKSE broadcasts using HD Radio technology.  Its HD2 digital subchannel simulcasts sports radio sister station WGR 550 AM.  The HD3 subchannel simulcasts co-owned WBEN 930's news/talk programming.

History

In , the station signed on as WHLD-FM.   It was the FM counterpart to WHLD 1270 AM and largely simulcast the AM station's programming in its early years.  In the late 1960s, it switched to a beautiful music format with some classical music programming as well.

The station changed its call sign to WZIR in 1980, WRXT in 1984, and the current call sign in early 1985.  The current Top 40/CHR format has been in place since September 1984. Much of its playlist overlaps that of sister station Star 102.5 at times. WKSE carried the syndicated weekly show The Rockin' America Top 30 Countdown with Scott Shannon throughout the 1980s.

WKSE sold its broadcast tower to Vertical Bridge in March 2019.  WKSE continues to use the tower under a leasing arrangement.

Until 2011, WKSE had a significant listenership throughout the Greater Toronto Area and Southern Ontario where the signal overlapped. After the launch of urban contemporary CKFG-FM that October in the adjacent 98.7 MHz frequency, WKSE lost much of its prominence in the Toronto market and became a bit harder to find on some radio receivers with weaker tuners, and listeners in Canada couldn't use the Audacy app to stream the station as it was restricted to users in the United States.

Programming
Janet Snyder has been the station's morning show co-host since 1989, with her co-host Nicholas Pickolas joining in 1994.

References

External links

KSE
Contemporary hit radio stations in the United States
Audacy, Inc. radio stations
Radio stations established in 1947
1947 establishments in New York (state)